Gynaecothoenas, "the god feasted by women", was an epithet of the Ancient Greek god Ares at Tegea. In a war of the Tegeatans against the Lacedaemonian king Charillus, the women of Tegea made an attack upon the enemy from an ambuscade. This decided the victory. The women therefore celebrated the victory alone, and excluded the men from the sacrificial feast. This, according to Pausanias, gave rise to the surname of Ares.

References

Citations

Sources

Epithets of Ares
Women in ancient Greek warfare
Religion in ancient Arcadia
Greek war deities